Nazir Mansuri is a Gujarati language novelist and short story writer. His stories were translated by Sachin Ketkar and Hemang Desai. He is a professor at a college in Navsari.

Biography
Nazir Mansuri was born in 1965. He received Katha Award for creative fiction in 1997 for his short story “Bhuthar”.  In 1999, he received Sanskruti Pratishthan Award. His story “Bhuthar” was selected for  The Best of the Nineties’ Fiction brought out by Katha Foundation, Delhi.

He works as a lecturer in a college at Navsari, Gujarat. Many of his stories have been translated into English by Sachin Ketkar and Hemang Desai. The translations of his stories have appeared in Indian Literature and New Quest.

Bibliography 
Short Story Collections
 Dhal Kachbo, (Published by R.R. Sheth Ahmedabad, 2002)

Novels
 Chandalchakrao' (Published by Parshwa Publications, Ahmedabad, 2009) 

 Veshpalto' (Published by Parshwa Publications, Ahmedabad, 2009) 

Online fiction
Sea Hawk Trans. Hemang Desai
The Hyena. Sachin Ketkar

References

Writers from Gujarat
Indian Muslims
Gujarati people
Gujarati-language writers
1965 births
Living people